Sarabjit Ladda (born 10 July 1986) is an Indian cricketer who plays for Punjab in domestic cricket. He is a right-handed batsman and a legbreak bowler. He is currently a member of the Gujarat Lions squad in the Indian Premier League. He married Nidhi Pandey on 25 January 2016 in Patiala.

References

1986 births
Cricketers from Patiala
Indian cricketers
Living people
Kolkata Knight Riders cricketers
Punjab, India cricketers
Delhi Capitals cricketers
India Green cricketers
Gujarat Lions cricketers